Robert April, Jr. (born April 15, 1953) is an American football coach.  He has held various special teams coaching positions in the National Football League (NFL).

Coaching career

College career
April coached college football at Southern Mississippi, Tulane, Arizona, Southern California, Ohio St. and LSU.

Professional career
April has coached at the NFL level with the Atlanta Falcons, Pittsburgh Steelers, New Orleans Saints, St. Louis Rams, Buffalo Bills, Philadelphia Eagles, Oakland Raiders, New York Jets and Tennessee Titans. 

He has won two NFL Special teams coach of the year awards, one in 2004, and another in 2008.

Personal life
His son, Bobby April III, is a college and NFL coach.

References

External links
Nicholls State bio
LSU bio 
Atlanta Falcons bio
Buffalo Bills bio
New Orleans Saints bio
New York Jets bio
Philadelphia Eagles bio
Pittsburgh Steelers bio
St. Louis Rams bio

1953 births
Living people
Players of American football from New Orleans
Nicholls Colonels football players
Arizona Wildcats football coaches
LSU Tigers football coaches
Ohio State Buckeyes football coaches
Southern Miss Golden Eagles football coaches
Tulane Green Wave football coaches
USC Trojans football coaches
Atlanta Falcons coaches
Buffalo Bills coaches
New Orleans Saints coaches
New York Jets coaches
Oakland Raiders coaches
Philadelphia Eagles coaches
Pittsburgh Steelers coaches
St. Louis Rams coaches
Tennessee Titans coaches
High school football coaches in Louisiana